Train Valley is a puzzle-strategy train simulator video game developed by Flazm, released on September 16, 2015. It is available for download on Steam and iOS. A sequel, titled Train Valley 2, was released on March 29, 2018. Train Valley: Console Edition was released on PlayStation 4, Nintendo Switch and Xbox One on July 27, 2022.

Gameplay 
The player needs to build railways in order to connect cities. Rails are cheap, except when demolishing houses or other objects. In each level, the player must use railway tracks to connect the different stations on the map to transfer materials between stations, having to manage increasing traffic by constructing crossroads and switches. The main objective of each level is to deliver each train to its destination without going bankrupt, but every level also has three advanced objectives, such as "do not stop trains" or "do not destroy tracks". There are 4 chapters in the base game – Europe (in the time period of 1830–1980), America (1840–1960), USSR (1880–1980) and Japan (1900–2020), with a fifth, Germany (1880–2020), as downloadable content (DLC). All chapters have 6 levels, for a total of 24 levels, plus 6 more in the Germany DLC, bringing the total number of levels to 30.

Development 

Flazm's first railroad game, called Railway Valley, was developed by Alexey Davydov in 2008. Four years later, two sequels, Railway Valley 2 and Railway Valley Missions, were released. They were downloaded 15 million times.

Development for Train Valley started in April 2012. At the end of 2013 they showed the game at game conferences and collected user feedback. In November 2014 the game became the winner in the "Family Friendly Game" category at Casual Connect Belgrade. During the Steam Greenlight campaign in August 2014, they got support from over 10,000 players. They then added a new sandbox mode, without money or time limits.

Train Valley entered Steam Early Access on May 9, 2015, and was fully released on September 16, 2015.

Reception 

Train Valley was rated Best Family Friendly Game at Casual Connect 2014 and Best Game Design at Casual Connect 2015, and also received an Indie Prize for Best Kids and Family Game. It was also nominated for Best Indie Game and Showcase at DevGAMM 2014.

The game received mixed reviews on Metacritic. Reviewers liked the idea of placing players in different time periods and locations, but found  the challenges repetitive. Train Valley was praised for being a game that was easy to learn but hard to master, but it didn't give enough to the gaming genre to imprint a mark. The game was said to be both frustrating and addictive, but also incredibly rewarding. GameWatcher criticized the game for being repetitive and "without any real ambition", and not making bridges or tunnels available for the player to use when traversing terrain.

References

External links 
 Official website

2015 video games
Early access video games
IOS games
MacOS games
Puzzle video games
Single-player video games
Simulation video games
Steam Greenlight games
Strategy video games
Transport simulation games
Vehicle simulation games
Video games developed in Lithuania
Windows games